Vanchiyoor is a locality in downtown Thiruvananthapuram city, the capital of the India state of Kerala. Vanchiyoor occupies an important place in the history of Travancore. It was the district headquarters and most important offices were situated here. There are a lot of heritage monuments in the area. Major administrative, commercial, government and judicial establishments are still located in Vanchiyoor. It is part of Vanchiyoor Village, which holds the prominent administrative headquarters and landmarks of Kerala. 
Proximity with major educational institutions, offices and shopping centres coupled with easy road connectivity with all parts of the city make it a favoured residential locale in Thiruvananthapuram.

Prominent government buildings in Vanchiyoor Village
 Government Secretariate
 District Civil and Criminal Courts
 District Treasury
 Central Railway Station
 Central Bus Station
 Central Telegraph Office
 City Rationing Office
 Employment Exchange
 General Post Office
 Accountant General (A&E) Kerala
 Old Collecterate
 Old High Court
 Passport Office

Educational institutions

Universities
Sree Sankara University of Sanskrit, Trivandrum Campus

Colleges
Govt. Ayurveda College, Trivandrum

Schools
Fort High School
SMV Govt. Model High School
Holy Angels Convent Girls Higher Secondary School
Chinmaya Vidyalaya, Kunnumpuram
Govt High School, Vanchiyoor
Govt. UPS, Chettikulangara
St.JOSEPH HIGHER SECONDARY SCHOOL

Educational Consultancy

Qmens Consultancy (P)Ltd

Religious institutions

Hindu temples and ashrams
Sree Padmanabha Swamy Temple
Sreekanteswaram Temple
Pazhavangadi Ganapathi Temple
Rishimangalam Sree Krishna Swami Temple
Chettikulangara Devi Temple
Pazhaya Sreekanteswaram Temple
Kovilvila Bhagavati Temple
Abhedananda Ashram

Churches
St. Thomas Marthoma Church, Pattoor
Knanaya Syrian Church, Pattoor
St. George Orthodox Cathedral, Spencer Junction,M G Road

Mosques
Juma Masjid, Thampanoor

Other institutions
YMCA Trivandrum (since 1873)

References

Suburbs of Thiruvananthapuram